The 2002 Northern Ford Premiership season was the second tier of British rugby league during the 2002 season. The competition began with nineteen teams, but York Wasps folded early in the season. Huddersfield Giants winning the Grand Final. This was the last season of the Premiership as for 2003 the teams were split into two divisions of the National League.

Championship
The league was won by the Huddersfield Giants, who beat the Leigh Centurions in the Grand Final. Huddersfield Giants were promoted to the Super League.

League table

 
York Wasps started this season but ceased to exist after 11 games. Their results were expunged from the records.

Play-offs
Week 1:
 Hull Kingston Rovers 11 Oldham 19.
 Featherstone Rovers 42 Whitehaven Warriors 14.
 Doncaster Dragons 14 Batley Bulldogs 27.
 
Week 2:
 Huddersfield Giants 36 Leigh Centurions 10.
 Rochdale Hornets 6 Oldham 20.
 Featherstone Rovers 30 Batley Bulldogs 32.
 
Week 3:
 Batley Bulldogs 26 Oldham 16.
 
Week 4:
 Leigh Centurions 35 Batley Bulldogs 28.

Grand Final

See also
2002 Challenge Cup

External links
2002 season at wigan.rlfans.com

Rugby Football League Championship
Northern Ford Premiership